Société Nationale d'électricité du Burkina Faso (SONABEL) is the national electricity company of Burkina Faso. The company represents Burkina Faso in the West African Power Pool.

References

External links

Official website

Electric power companies of Burkina Faso